Furnace Fest is an American music festival held over three days at the Sloss Furnaces National Historical Landmark in Birmingham, Alabama. It ran annually each August from 2000–2003, and has since resumed each September since 2021. As of 2022, Furnace Fest has been held six times, with its most recent edition taking place from September 23–25, 2022.

The festival was founded in 2000 by Chad Johnson, then-owner of Birmingham-based Christian hardcore record label Takehold Records. Though a great many performers at Furnace Fest were Christian hardcore, metalcore and emo bands (including most bands signed to the aforementioned label), the event itself did not focus on religious beliefs. After Takehold Records was bought-out by Tooth & Nail Records in March 2002, which required Johnson moving to Seattle, Washington, the future of the festival was uncertain. Johnson successfully hosted a third edition in August 2002, and then briefly considered relocating the festival to Seattle. In August 2003, a DVD containing footage of Furnace Fest 2002 was released by 3B Studios.

In 2003, the organization of Furnace Fest was passed on to Shannon Schlappi, then-owner of Independence, Missouri-based hardcore record label Anxiety Records, who successfully organized a fourth edition of the festival at the same location. Schlappi intended to continue the festival in 2004, but due to heavy financial losses incurred from the 2003 event, and the owners of the Sloss Furnaces demanding an increase in rental price for the site, Furnace Fest was put on hold. Schlappi hoped to resume the festival in 2005, but it did not happen.

In mid-2019, Johnson revived Furnace Fest and scheduled the fifth edition to take place from September 18–20, 2020. The official press release of the revived festival, along with news of the first confirmed band to be booked, Beloved, was announced on November 29, 2019. A Nashville, Tennessee-based limited liability company, Furnace Fest LLC, was formed on April 10, 2020, to control the legal interests of the festival. The new corporate structure is a four-way partnership divided between Johnny Grimes (based in Birmingham), Mike Ziemer (based in Dallas, Texas), Ryan Luther and Chad Johnson (both based in Nashville, Tennessee). On June 1, 2020, it was announced that the festival's fifth event had been postponed due to the COVID-19 pandemic, and most bands were automatically re-booked to perform at the rescheduled event, set to take place between May 14–16, 2021. By March 2021, the event had again been rescheduled, this time for September 24–26, 2021. The festival's sixth event took place from September 23–25, 2022.

Furnace Fest Community 

On January 1, 2020, a Facebook group called Furnace Fest Community was created by Samuel Cook, a fan of Furnace Fest who planned on attending the revival. The group quickly grew, gathering members from all over the world and catching the attention of the Furnace Fest organizers, who themselves joined and were able to observe their audience and present ideas to gauge fan interest. In an effort to keep members engaged between each year's festival, the moderators implemented themed days: Self-Promotion Sunday, New Merch and Music Monday, Thrift Store Tuesday, Wishlist Wednesday, Band Camp Friday, and Selfie Saturday. The group has also hosted live events, including a livestream of the Beloved hometown show and a listening party hosted by Hardcore Hotline, as well as community get-togethers, such as a trip to South Carolina for a Furnace Fest Prom and Stretch Arm Strong show. The public group continues to grow, now with over 11,000 members.

Furnace Fest lineups by year

August 11–13, 2000 
Notes: Overcome played its farewell show, and Strongarm performed a reunion show, both on Saturday, August 12, 2000. Caption, Pensive and Reach the Sky were also booked but did not perform.

Friday August 11 

 Burn It Down
 Candiria
 Eso-Charis
 Figure Four
 Forever and a Day
 Glasseater
 Isis
 Living Sacrifice
 Narcissus
 No Innocent Victim
 Not Waving but Drowning
 One Step Back
 Selfminded
 Squad Five-O
 Stairwell
 The Dillinger Escape Plan (headliners)
 Underoath
 Vessel
 Zao

Saturday August 12 

 A New Found Glory
 Brandtson
 Brother's Keeper
 Clenched Fist
 Disciple
 Esteem
 Few Left Standing
 Further Seems Forever
 Haste
 Overcome
 Shai Hulud
 Shockwave
 Stretch Arm Strong
 Strongarm (headliners)
 Tantrum of the Muse
 Terra Firma
 The Blamed
 The Casket Lottery
 Twothirtyeight
 Where Fear and Weapons Meet

Sunday August 13 

 Blindside
 Codeseven
 Cooter
 Crucible
 Embodyment
 Greycoat
 Hopesfall
 Legends of Rodeo
 Luti-Kriss
 No Comply
 Post-Offset
 Red Roses for a Blue Lady
 Redeem
 Slick Shoes
 Society's Finest
 Spitfire
 Tenderfoot
 The 65 Filmshow
 The Handshake Murders (headliners)
 The Jazz June
 The Juliana Theory

August 2–4, 2001 
Notes: Squad Five-O was booked but did not perform.

Thursday August 2 

 Drowningman
 Eighteen Visions
 Element 101
 Hatebreed
 Living Sacrifice (headliners)
 Luti-Kriss
 Narcissus
 No Innocent Victim
 River City High
 Spitfire
 Tantrum of the Muse
 The Huntingtons
 The Operation
 The Wednesdays
 Twelve Tribes
 Waterdown
 XDISCIPLEx A.D.
 Yellowcard

Friday August 3 

 Darkest Hour
 Dynamite Boy
 Fairweather
 Figure Four
 Further Seems Forever
 Gainer
 Haste
 Like David
 Not Waving but Drowning
 Shai Hulud
 Small Brown Bike
 Society's Finest
 Soilent Green
 The Stryder
 Twothirtyeight
 Underoath
 Unwed Sailor
 Zao (headliners)

Saturday August 4 

 As Friends Rust
 Bloodjinn
 Brandtson
 Brother's Keeper
 Converge (headliners)
 Elliott
 Few Left Standing
 Glasseater
 Ghoti Hook
 Hopesfall
 Junction 18
 New Found Glory
 Point of Recognition
 Reach the Sky
 Sleeping by the Riverside
 Stairwell
 Stretch Arm Strong
 The Hope Conspiracy

August 1–3, 2002 
Notes: The third edition of Furnace Fest was originally scheduled for the weekend of August 8–10, 2002, but it was moved up by a week. It was the first year to feature two stages; the Side Stage was sponsored by Century Media and its subsidiary Abacus Recordings. Zao announced that it would be playing its farewell show at Furnace Fest 2002, though the band ultimately decided to reform. Eso-Charis performed a reunion show at the festival. Coheed and Cambria, Meshuggah and Welton were booked but did not perform.

Thursday August 1

Main Stage 

 7 Angels 7 Plagues
 A Static Lullaby
 Codeseven
 Curl Up and Die
 Death Threat
 From Autumn to Ashes
 Glasseater
 Haste
 Hatebreed (headliners)
 Hopesfall
 In Flames
 No Innocent Victim
 NORA
 Shai Hulud
 Skycamefalling
 Still Breathing
 Stretch Arm Strong
 Terror
 Thirty Two Frames

Side Stage 

 Aislinn
 Die Radio Die
 Everbleeding
 Evergreen Terrace
 Fall with Me
 Falling Cycle
 Moneybags Gram
 Mortal Treason
 Nine Lives
 Over My Dead Body
 Such Is Life
 Taken
 The Handshake Murders
 The Mora Luna
 The Uriah Omen
 Time to Fly
 Under the Red (headliners)
 Unfisted

Friday August 2

Main Stage 

 Andrew W.K. (headliners)
 Avenged Sevenfold
 Bane
 Blindside
 BoySetsFire
 Eighteen Visions
 Eso-Charis
 Every Time I Die
 God Forbid
 Love Is Red
 Most Precious Blood
 Norma Jean
 One Nation Under
 Prevent Falls
 Snapcase
 Squad Five-O
 The Dillinger Escape Plan
 The Exit
 Throwdown

Side Stage 

 Beloved
 Christiansen
 Cool Hand Luke
 Copeland
 Emanuel 7
 Farewell Hope
 Grandview
 In Clover (headliners)
 Light Is the Language
 Noise Ratchet
 Nourish the Flame
 Salt the Earth
 Stairwell
 Sworn Enemy
 The Ghost
 The Operation
 Time in Malta
 Twothirtyeight

Saturday August

Main Stage 

 Ace Troubleshooter
 Anberlin
 Brandtson
 Celebrity
 Dead Poetic
 Denison Marrs
 Elliott
 Further Seems Forever
 Living Sacrifice
 mewithoutyou
 Narcissus
 Pedro the Lion
 Roadside Monument
 Sick of It All
 The Casket Lottery
 The Pits
 Ultimate Fakebook
 Underoath
 Zao (headliners)

Side Stage 

 As I Lay Dying
 Between the Buried and Me
 Bleeding Through (headliners)
 Breaking Pangea
 BoyWunder
 Dynamite Boy
 Kid Gorgeous
 Lost City Angels
 Marty A.D.
 Not Waving but Drowning
 Open Hand
 Safety in Numbers
 Symphony in Peril
 The Commercials
 The September Engagement
 The Young and the Useless
 This Day Forward
 Unearth

August 15–17, 2003 
Notes: Stretch Arm Strong's album Engage was released at Furnace Fest. Bayside, Evelynn, My Hotel Year, Rifles at Recess, Rogue Nation, Spitafield, The Black Dahlia Murder, The Death Campaign and The Backup Plan were booked but did not perform. Fordirelifesake was booked early on but pulled out due to a scheduling conflict with their Canadian tour.

Friday August 15

Main Stage 

 A Life Once Lost
 Anberlin
 As I Lay Dying
 Codeseven
 Copeland
 Dead Poetic
 Further Seems Forever (headliners)
 Haste
 Hopesfall
 Mae
 Minus the Bear
 Sincebyman
 Silverstein
 The Agony Scene
 This Day Forward

Side Stage 

 Across Five Aprils
 Armor for Sleep
 Bear vs. Shark
 Boys Night Out
 Celebrity
 Christiansen
 Flattery Leads to Ruins
 Found Dead Hanging
 Halfacre Gunroom
 Haste the Day
 Mercury Switch
 Plate 6
 Rescue
 Staring Back

Saturday August 16

Main Stage 

 Andrew W.K.
 Avenged Sevenfold
 Finch
 Forever Is Forgotten
 Hatebreed
 Hum (headliners)
 In Reverent Fear
 Mastodon
 Promise the Ghost
 Rise Against
 Salt the Earth
 Shai Hulud
 Taking Back Sunday
 The Red Chord
 Unearth
 Vaux

Side Stage 

 A Small Victory
 Analog
 Cold Remember
 Day Two (headliners)
 Die Radio Die
 Earthen
 Embrace Today
 From First to Last
 Love Is Red
 National Fire Theory
 Nehemiah
 Not Quite Bernadette
 Showbread
 Trelese
 Uses Fire
 With Honor

Sunday August 17

Main Stage 

 Anatomy of a Ghost
 Beloved
 Coma Eternal
 Evergreen Terrace
 Every Time I Die
 Fear Before the March of Flames
 Kid Gorgeous
 Martyr A.D.
 Norma Jean
 Saved by Grace
 Stretch Arm Strong (headliners)
 Terror
 The Bled
 Throwdown

Side Stage 

 Comeback Kid
 Day of Contempt
 End of All
 From a Second Story Window
 Glasseater
 Ill Allegiance
 Scars of Tomorrow
 The A.K.A.s
 The Judas Cradle
 The Program
 The Takeover
 This Runs Through

September 24–26, 2021 
These were the bands at the time of the daily schedule being released. '68, As Friends Rust, Gideon, Glasseater, Hatebreed, Misery Signals, Open Hand, Poison the Well, and The Darling Fire were scheduled to play but unfortunately cancelled.

Friday September 24

Level X Stage (Main Stage)
 Underoath
  Thursday
 Every Time I Die
  Emery
 Cave In
  Emery
 Silent Planet
 If I Die First

Plug Your Holes Stage (The Shed)
  Converge
  Zao
 From Autumn To Ashes
 Eighteen Visions
 Haste
 Few Left Standing
 As Cities Burn
 Narcissus
 Defeater
 Across Five Aprils
 Reclaim The Empyre

HeartSupport Stage (The Pond)
 Walls of Jericho
 With Honor
 Stavesacre
 Luxury
 Terminal
 Unwed Sailor
 Astronoid
 End
 SeeYouSpaceCowboy
 Rivals
 Mr. Enc

Saturday September 25

Level X Stage (Main Stage)
 Taking Back Sunday
 Mayday Parade
 Anberlin
 The Bled
 Mae
  Cartel
 Scary Kids Scaring Kids
 He Is Legend

Plug Your Holes Stage (The Shed)
 Glassjaw
 Stretch Arm Strong
 Beloved
 Deafheaven
 Living Sacrifice
 Shai Hulud
 Hopesfall
 Bloodjinn
 Evergreen Terrace
 Better Off
 Nominee

HeartSupport Stage (The Pond)
 Further Seems Forever
  Mineral
 Touché Amoré
 Jeremy Enigk
 Codeseven
 The Appleseed Cast
 The Beautiful Mistake
 The Classic Crime
 All Get Out
 The Hollywood Horses
 For The Best

Sunday September 26

Level X Stage (Main Stage)
 Killswitch Engage
 August Burns Red
 Motionless In White
 Hot Water Music
 Face To Face
 Erra
 Fit For A King
 Varials

Plug Your Holes Stage (The Shed)
  Turnstile
 Knocked Loose
 BoySetsFire
  Darkest Hour
 Unearth
 Bury Your Dead
 Comeback Kid
 Piebald
 Love is Red
 Be Well
 Holy+Gold

HeartSupport Stage (The Pond)
 The Get Up Kids
 The Juliana Theory
  Anthony Green
  Showbread
 The Casket Lottery
 Microwave
 The Judas Cradle
 Bad Cop Bad Cop
 Dying Wish
 Meadows

September 23–25, 2022 
Most Precious Blood, Crossfaith and Open Hand was scheduled to perform but were unfortunately cancelled

Friday September 23

Wheelhouse Stage (Main Stage)
 Thrice (performing the Illusion of Safety)
 New Found Glory
 Alexisonfire
 Quicksand
 Norma Jean 
 Anti-Flag
 Midtown
 Strung Out
 Impending Doom
 Dead To fall
 One Step Closer

Plug Your Holes Stage (The Shed)
 Shadows Fall
 The Acacia Strain
 Stretch Arm Strong
 Madball
 Integrity
 E.Town Concrete
 Glasseater
 Close Your Eyes
 Morning Again
 Capri Sun aka Capra
 Forced Neglect

Baked Brothers Stage (The Pond)
 Movements
 Fiddlehead
 Angel Du$t
 Drug Church
 Apprehend
 The News Can Wait
 '68
 Games We Play
 Doll Skin
 The Darling Fire
 Fauxdeep

Saturday September 24

Wheelhouse Stage (Main Stage)
 Sunny Day Real Estate
 Manchester Orchestra
 The Ghost Inside
 Poison The Well
 Elliott (performing False Cathedrals)
 Cursive
 The Joy Formidable
 MyChildren MyBride
 Idle Threat
 Stay Lost
 Godseyes (contest winner)

Plug Your Holes Stage (The Shed)
 Blindside (performing Silence)
 Maylene and The Sons of Disaster
 Demon Hunter
 Earth Crisis
 Bleeding Through
 Figure Four
 Misery Signals
 Counterparts
 The Showdown
 Life in Your Way
 Advent

Baked Brothers Stage (The Pond)
 Pedro The Lion
 The Spill Canvas
 Five Iron Frenzy
 Squad 5-0
 Hidden in Plain View
 Roadside Monument
 The Appleseed Cast
 Stairwell
 Watashi Wa
 Mock Orange
 Joyboy

Sunday September 25

Wheelhouse Stage (Main Stage) 
 Mastodon
 Descendents
 The Story So Far
 In Flames
 Periphery
 Lagwagon
 Four Years Strong (performing Enemy of The World)
 Spiritbox
 Comeback Kid
 Jesus Piece
 Orbit Culture

Plug Your Holes Stage (The Shed)
 American Nightmare
 Sick of it All
 Agnostic Front
 Avail
 Strike Anywhere
 Stick To Your Guns
 The Red Chord
 Kublai Khan TX
 Dying Wish
 Get The Shot
 Wristmeetrazor

Baked Brothers Stage (The Pond)
 Mom Jeans
 As Friends Rust
 Nothing
 Slow Crush
 A Wilhelm Scream
 Koyo
 The Higher
 Soul Glo
 Free Throw
 Belmont
 Just Like Heaven

References

External links
 Official website
 Furnace Fest Community FAQs

2000 establishments in Alabama
Christian music festivals
Fall events in the United States
Festivals in Birmingham, Alabama
Heavy metal festivals in the United States
Music festivals established in 2000
Music festivals in Alabama
Music organizations based in the United States
Punk rock festivals
Rock festivals in the United States
Summer events in the United States